Sphaerodactylus caicosensis,  also known as the Caicos banded sphaero or Caicos least gecko, is a species of lizard in the family Sphaerodactylidae . It is endemic to the Caicos Islands.

References

Sphaerodactylus
Lizards of the Caribbean
Fauna of the Turks and Caicos Islands
Reptiles described in 1934
Taxa named by Doris Mable Cochran